Battle of Hefei may refer to:

Historical battles 
Battle of Hefei (208), fought between Sun Quan and Cao Cao in 208
Battle of Xiaoyao Ford, also known as the Battle of Hefei, fought between Sun Quan and Cao Cao between 214 and 215
Battle of Hefei (231), fought between Eastern Wu and Cao Wei in 231
Battle of Hefei (233), fought between Eastern Wu and Cao Wei in 233
Battle of Hefei (234), also known as Battle of Xincheng, Hefei, fought between Eastern Wu and Cao Wei in 234
Battle of Hefei (253), also known as Battle of Xincheng, Hefei, fought between Eastern Wu and Cao Wei in 253

de:2. Schlacht von Hefei
ja:合肥の戦い
th:ศึกหับป๋า
vi:Trận Hợp Phì
zh:合肥之戰